Kangro is a common Estonian surname.

Notable persons
Bernard Kangro (1910-1994), writer and poet
Eva Merike Kangro-Pennar (1950–1997), journalist and linguist
Evald Kangro (1913–1941), military man
Gunnar Kangro (1913–1975), mathematician
Karl Kangro (1861–1935), veterinarian
Kirke Kangro (born 1975), artist
Maarja Kangro (born 1973), translator and poet
Mart Kangro, dancer and choreographer
Peeter Kangro (1901-1990), military man
Raimo Kangro (1949-2001), composer and pedagogue
Rasmus Kangro-Pool (1890-1963), literary and theatre critic
Tauno Kangro (born 1966), sculptor
Tiina Kangro (born 1961), journalist and politician

See also
Kangur (surname)

Estonian-language surnames
Occupational surnames